11/30/93 – Las Vegas, Nevada is a live album and the first in a series of archival official bootleg releases by the American alternative rock band Pearl Jam, made available in MP3 format at the band's official download website in 2006. The bootleg was recorded at the first of two nights at the Aladdin Theatre for the Performing Arts in Paradise, Nevada.

Overview
The show, which took place on November 30, 1993, at the Aladdin Theatre for the Performing Arts in Paradise, Nevada, is from the first leg of the band's tour for its second album, Vs., but also features some material off of the band's third album, Vitalogy, including the live premiere of "Tremor Christ". The second encore featured two songs by the band Green River, guested on by former members Mark Arm and Steve Turner, both now of Mudhoney. Guitarist Stone Gossard and bassist Jeff Ament are both former members of Green River. Chuck Treece filled in on drums for Green River drummer Alex Vincent. The band performed the songs "Swallow My Pride" and "Ain't Nothing to Do" before leaving the stage. The bootleg does not include the version of "My Way", performed with Elvis impersonator Terry Presley, which had previously been released on the band's 1995 fan club Christmas single. The version of "Swallow My Pride" from this show appears on the same fan club single.

Track listing
"Even Flow" (Eddie Vedder, Stone Gossard) – 5:02
"Once" (Vedder, Gossard) – 3:17
"Deep" (Vedder, Gossard, Jeff Ament) – 4:23
"Jeremy" (Vedder, Ament) – 6:27
"Dissident" (Dave Abbruzzese, Ament, Gossard, Mike McCready, Vedder) – 3:35 then Across the Universe
"Daughter" (Abbruzzese, Ament, Gossard, McCready, Vedder) – 5:26 then into Instant Karma
"Go" (Abbruzzese, Ament, Gossard, McCready, Vedder) – 3:01
"Animal" (Abbruzzese, Ament, Gossard, McCready, Vedder) – 2:49
"State of Love and Trust" (Vedder, McCready, Ament) – 3:39
"Tremor Christ" (Abbruzzese, Ament, Gossard, McCready, Vedder) – 3:56
"Black" (Vedder, Gossard) – 5:36
"Blood" (Abbruzzese, Ament, Gossard, McCready, Vedder) – 2:38
"Alive" (Vedder, Gossard) – 5:16
"Rearviewmirror" (Abbruzzese, Ament, Gossard, McCready, Vedder) – 5:02
"Whipping" (Abbruzzese, Ament, Gossard, McCready, Vedder) – 2:39
"Leash" (Abbruzzese, Ament, Gossard, McCready, Vedder) – 3:09
"Porch" (Vedder) – 6:55
"Swallow My Pride" (Mark Arm, Steve Turner) (with Mark Arm and Steve Turner of Mudhoney, and Chuck Treece) – 3:55
"Ain't Nothing to Do" (Stiv Bators, Cheetah Chrome) (with Mark Arm and Steve Turner of Mudhoney, and Chuck Treece) – 4:11

Personnel
Pearl Jam
Dave Abbruzzese – drums
Jeff Ament – bass guitar
Stone Gossard – guitars
Mike McCready – guitars
Eddie Vedder – vocals, guitars

Additional musicians
Mark Arm – vocals on "Swallow My Pride" and "Ain't Nothing to Do"
Chuck Treece – drums on "Swallow My Pride" and "Ain't Nothing to Do"
Steve Turner – guitar on "Swallow My Pride" and "Ain't Nothing to Do"

References

Pearl Jam Official Bootlegs
2006 live albums
Self-released albums
Albums recorded at Planet Hollywood Resort & Casino